Lakuzhdeh (also Romanized as Lākūzhdeh; also known as Kūzhdeh) is a village in Kiashahr Rural District, Kiashahr District, Astaneh-ye Ashrafiyeh County, Gilan Province, Iran. At the 2006 census, its population was 533, in 152 families.

References 

Populated places in Astaneh-ye Ashrafiyeh County